John Swinfen (19 March 1613 – 12 April 1694) was an English politician  who sat in the House of Commons  variously between 1645 and 1691.  He supported the Parliamentary cause in a civil capacity in the English Civil War.
  
Swinfen was probably the son of Richard Swinfen, of Swinfen, Staffordshire. He was educated at Pembroke College, Cambridge and graduated BA in 1632.  In 1645, Swinfen was elected Member of Parliament for Stafford in the Long Parliament. He was excluded in Pride's Purge in 1648. He was one of the Parliamentary Commissioners for Staffordshire. 

In 1659, Swinfen was elected MP for Tamworth in the Third Protectorate Parliament. He was elected MP for Stafford in 1660 in the Convention Parliament. In 1661 he was elected MP for Tamworth  for the Cavalier Parliament and sat until 1679. He was re-elected MP for Tamworth in 1681 and sat until 1685. In 1690, he was elected MP for  Bere Alston  and sat until 1691. 
 
Swinfen lived at Swinfen Hall near Freeford. He was commonly called " Russet-coat," from his affected plainness of dress. He died at the age of  81 and was buried at Weeford, Staffordshire.

Swinfen married Ann Brandreth, daughter of John Brandreth and Jane Weston.

References

 

1613 births
1694 deaths
Roundheads
Alumni of Pembroke College, Cambridge
People from Tamworth, Staffordshire
Members of the Parliament of England (pre-1707) for Stafford
English MPs 1640–1648
English MPs 1659
English MPs 1660
English MPs 1661–1679
English MPs 1679
English MPs 1681
English MPs 1690–1695
Members of the Parliament of England for Bere Alston